Vurgun (English title: Profiteer) is a Turkish internet series produced by Buballs Pictures. The first season premiered on January 22, 2018. It was directed, produced and edited by Berk Sezen. The Art Director was Mine Çetkin. It was written by Gökdeniz Babadağ, Khazar Refizade and Berk Sezen. The series has 3 seasons and ended on May 4, 2021.

Plot 
Nur is a 'de facto mother' who left her children behind herself twenty years ago. She tosses herself from a lie to another lie to take care of the family she left behind herself. Money opens every door ever whatsoever: While Nur is a person who looks younger than her own university-attending daughter, the lies won't find their ends forever. Every mistake that was done and forgotten in the past will perhaps change the direction of the misery. The beginning of some stories are uncertain.

Characters

Broadcast schedule

References

Drama web series
2018 web series debuts
2021 web series endings